9 to 5 and Odd Jobs is the twenty-third solo studio album by American entertainer Dolly Parton. It was released on November 17, 1980, by RCA Records. A concept album about working, the album was centered on Parton's hit "9 to 5", which served as the theme song to the film of the same name (co-starring Parton, Jane Fonda and Lily Tomlin), and topped both the U.S. country and pop charts.  The album's two additional singles—a cover of Mike Settle's "But You Know I Love You" and a reading of "The House of the Rising Sun" – provided further country hits, with "But You Know I Love You" also reaching #1.

The understated pop-country arrangement of most of the songs was seen as a welcome return to form for Parton by critics, after the overly polished pop sound of Parton's previous albums. In addition to five Parton compositions, the album contained a number of folk and country classics, including work by Woody Guthrie, Mel Tillis and Merle Travis.

The album was produced by Mike Post (with the exception of "9 to 5", which was produced by Parton's bandleader Gregg Perry).

A 1983 reissue on cassette omitted the tracks "Detroit City" and "Dark as a Dungeon," and moved the song "Sing For The Common Man" to the end of Side 2. However, a 2009 reissue of the album included all ten of the album's original tracks, as well as a remixed version of "9 to 5", and a previously unreleased cover of Sly & the Family Stone's 1969 hit "Everyday People" as bonus cuts.

The album stayed at No. 1 on the Billboard Top Country Albums chart for 10 consecutive weeks and ended up being certified Gold by the Recording Industry Association of America.

Reception

AllMusic retrospectively rated 9 to 5 and Odd Jobs four-and-a-half out of five stars. William Ruhlmann, who reviewed the album, stated that due to RCA's practice of "shoving poorly organized products onto the market, most of Parton's albums are hard to recommend", but that "[the songs are] enough to put it a notch above most of Parton's RCA catalog." Critic Robert Christgau rated the album a B+, stating that how one would respond to the album "depends on [his/her] tolerance for fame-game schlock", although he also said that "I'd never claim Johnny Carson's damaged [Parton's] pipes or her brains".

Track listing

Personnel
Dolly Parton – vocals/nails 
Reggie Young – guitar
Jeff Baxter, Marty Walsh – guitar on "9 to 5"
Larry Carlton – guitar on "House of the Rising Sun" and "Working Girl"
Leland Sklar – bass guitar
Abraham Laboriel – bass guitar on "9 to 5"
Joe McGuffee – steel guitar
John Goux – slide guitar on "The House of the Rising Sun"
Sonny Osborne – banjo
Ron Oates – keyboards
Ian Underwood – synthesizer
Gregg Perry – organ on "Poor Folks Town"
Larry Knechtel – piano on "9 to 5"
Eddie Bayers – drums
Rick Shlosser – drums on "9 to 5"
Lenny Castro – percussion on "9 to 5" 
Tom Saviano – saxophone on "9 to 5"
Ken Hutchcroft – baritone saxophone on "9 to 5"
Jerry Hey – trumpet on "9 to 5"
Bill Reichenbach – trombone on "9 to 5"
Mike Post – synthesized flute on "But You Know I Love You"
Anita Ball, Joey Scarbury, Richard Dennison – backing vocals
Anita Ball, Denise Maynelli, Stephanie Spruill – backing vocals on "9 to 5"
Bobby Osborne, Sonny Osborne – backing vocals on "Hush-a-Bye Hard Times"
Sid Sharp – concertmaster
Technical
Chuck Britz, Doug Parry, Larry Carlton, Marshall Morgan, Paul Dobbe – engineer
George Corsillo – art direction, design
Tom Bryant – art direction
Ron Slenzak – photography

Charts
Album

Album (Year-End)

References

External links
9 To 5 (And Odd Jobs) at Dolly Parton On-Line

Dolly Parton albums
1980 albums
Concept albums
RCA Records albums
Albums produced by Mike Post